197, 199, 201 Albion Street terrace cottages are three heritage-listed terraced houses located at 197, 199, 201 Albion Street in the inner city Sydney suburb of Surry Hills in the City of Sydney local government area of New South Wales, Australia. It was added to the New South Wales State Heritage Register on 2 April 1999.

History and description 
A row of three Victorian Georgian town houses of two storeys built between 1845 and 1847. The front verandah has been reconstructed. The walls are sand stock brick and the roof is corrugated steel sheeting.

Heritage listing 
The terrace cottages site was listed on the New South Wales State Heritage Register on 2 April 1999.

See also 

203-205 Albion Street cottages

References

Attribution 

New South Wales State Heritage Register sites located in Surry Hills
Houses in Surry Hills, New South Wales
Articles incorporating text from the New South Wales State Heritage Register
1847 establishments in Australia
Houses completed in 1847
Terraced houses in Sydney
Albion Street, Surry Hills, 197, 199, 201